Seachtain na Gaeilge  (English: Irish language week), known for sponsorship purposes as Seachtain na Gaeilge le Energia, is an annual international festival promoting the Irish language and culture, both in Ireland and all around the world. Established in 1902, it is the biggest Irish language festival in the world, reaching over 1 million people on 5 continents each year.

Events
The festival lasts seventeen days and begins on St. David's Day on 1 March and runs until St Patrick's Day on 17 March each year, with community-organised events celebrated all over Ireland and the world, such as céilís, concerts, quizzes, competitions and parades. Many sporting events are organised during Seachtain na Gaeilge. In 2018, Seachtain na Gaeilge le Energia coincided with Rith.

History

Seachtain na Gaeilge was founded as part of the Gaelic Revival by Conradh na Gaeilge in 1902, and has gone from strength to strength in recent years. Like its earliest Irish ancestors, the 14th-century Gairm Sgoile (Early Modern Irish: "Summoning", or "Gathering", "of the [Bardic] School") and the 18th-century Munster Cúirt ("Poetic Court), Seachtain na Gaeilge includes a contest between composers of Irish poetry in the Irish-language.

Energia has been a sponsor of the festival since 2017. "Úsáid do Theanga" (English: "Use your language") was the motto of the festival in 2020.

References

External links
Official website

Annual events in Ireland
Irish language organisations
Non-profit organisations based in the Republic of Ireland
Linguistic societies
Festivals in Ireland
1902 establishments in Ireland
Spring (season) events in the Republic of Ireland